Getir ("bring" in Turkish) is a Turkish startup company founded in 2015 that offers on-demand delivery services for grocery items and a courier service for restaurant food deliveries, accessed via a mobile app. In March 2022, Getir announced that it had raised US$$768 million in its Series E, valuing the company at nearly $12 billion.

History 
The company was founded in 2015 by a team including Nazım Salur, who also founded Turkish ride-hailing app BiTaksi. Getir expanded rapidly since then, having doubled its orders in the second half of 2019 to reach almost 1.5 million in December of that year. It generated $120 million from sales in 2019.

In July 2021, Getir bought Spanish online grocery startup BLOK, adding several major cities in Southern Europe to its delivery spots. On 23 November 2021, Getir bought U.K.-based hyper fast grocery delivery startup Weezy.

In March 2022, the company closed a Series E funding round, raising $768 million, with Mubadala Investment Company leading the round, making Getir's valuation  $12 billion.

In November 2022, Getir announced a partnership with the Dutch online food ordering company Just Eat Takeaway, that will integrate Getir's portfolio with apps under Just Eat Takeaway.

Getir acquired rival firm Gorillas in December 2022 for $1.25bn.

Operations 

All five of the company's services ("ultrafast" delivery, takeaway food delivery, online grocery shopping, online water ordering, ordering from local businesses, ordering a taxi (via BiTaksi), finding local employment) are offered through a single Getir app.
 getir
 getirfood
 getirwater
 getirmore
 getirlocals
 getirbitaxi
 getirjobs
 getirdrive

Projects

Getir Hackathon 
Getir Hackathon or also known as Getir-BiTaksi Hackathon was a yearly hackathon that started in 2016 was hosted until 2018. The main point of the event was to develop an iOS/Android app in 48 hours. The main prize for the event was 5000 TL.

Locations 
As of November 2021, Getir services are offered in all 81 Turkish provincial capital cities, 15 UK cities, 15 Dutch cities, 7 German cities, 9 French cities, 6 Spanish cities, 3 US cities, 1 Portuguese city, and 3 Italian cities:

Sponsorships 
 Association football
 Tottenham Hotspur
 Galatasaray
 Fenerbahçe
 Beşiktaş

 MLB
 New York Mets

References

External links 
 

Turkish brands
Retail companies established in 2015
Internet properties established in 2015
Online food ordering
2015 establishments in Turkey